Barbados competed at the 2011 World Aquatics Championships in Shanghai, China between July 16 and 31, 2011.

Swimming

Barbados qualified 1 swimmer.

Men

References

Nations at the 2011 World Aquatics Championships
2011
World Aquatics Championships